Dangerous Liaisons is a 2012 Chinese period romance drama film by Hur Jin-ho loosely based on the 1782 novel with the same title by Pierre Choderlos de Laclos. The novel has been adapted numerous times, including Les Liaisons dangereuses, an adaptation by Roger Vadim (1959), the eponymous Hollywood film (1988), Valmont (1989), Cruel Intentions (1999), and Untold Scandal from South Korea (2003).

This version is set in 1930s Shanghai and stars South Korean actor Jang Dong-gun and Chinese actresses Zhang Ziyi and Cecilia Cheung.

The film screened in the Directors' Fortnight section at the 2012 Cannes Film Festival, the 2012 Toronto International Film Festival, and the 2012 Busan International Film Festival.

Plot
Shanghai, September 1931: Wealthy businessman and playboy seducer Xie Yifan is introduced to his uncle's granddaughter, Du Fenyu, when his maternal grandmother, Du Ruixue, arrives at his apartment one day. Fenyu, a young widow who has just arrived from Northeast China (aka Manchuria) where the Japanese are making incursions, is staying at the country home of Madam Du, her grand-aunt.

At a glitzy fund-raiser for refugees thrown by Hudong Bank chairwoman Mo Jieyu at Yifan's nightclub, Jieyu, an old friend of Yifan who has never succumbed to his advances, asks him to rob Beibei, the 16-year-old fiancée of tycoon Jin Zhihuan, of her virginity. Jieyu wants revenge on Jin, for publicly dumping her in favor of a schoolgirl. Yifan turns down Jieyu's request, partly because he has another quarry in his sights on the quiet and retiring Fenyu. Sensing an opportunity for some sport, Jieyu makes Yifan a wager: if he can seduce Fenyu without falling in love, she will finally agree to have sex with him; if he fails, he will sign over a valuable piece of land to her. Yifan accepts the challenge, but finds the virtuous Fenyu apparently immune to his charms.

Meanwhile, Jieyu employs a different strategy to get her revenge on Jin, encouraging an attraction between Beibei and her young drawing teacher, college student Dai Wenzhou. Despite Jieyu's strenuous efforts, the relationship is never consummated; but when she finds out about it, Beibei's mother, Mrs. Zhu, forbids her daughter to see Wenzhou anymore. With time running out, Jieyu suggests to Mrs. Zhu that Beibei should spend some quiet time at Madam Du's estate—and secretly arranges for Yifan to be there, to "comfort" Beibei. His mission finally accomplished, Yifan refocuses on seducing Fenyu, but finds himself in deeper emotional waters than he has ever experienced.

During one night, a drunken Yifan approaches Jieyu, but realizes she is entangled in a relationship with Wenzhou. He sleeps on on Jieyu's bed and shouts out Fenyu's name, which Jieyu realizes he has fallen in love with the latter. The next morning, Jieyu uses an opportunity to call Fenyu over to embarrass Yifan, and when facing her, he claims that he grew tired of Fenyu, and was nothing more than a gambling bet. Heartbroken, she leaves. Yifan, feeling that his advances have won over Jieyu, celebrates his victory, but Jieyu turns him down and mocks him for thinking so. Enraged, he leaves and swears he will break Jieyu's heart. Jieyu then subsequently tells Wenzhou about Beibei. Eventually, Fenyu's leave causes Yifan regret, and is shot by Wenzhou on the road, who has realized the truth. Wounded, he finds Fenyu, who is about to commit suicide in her house, and begs to let her see him in desperation. Fenyu does not open the door until Yifan bleeds until his last moments, dying in Fenyu's arms.

Some time later, Fenyu becomes involved in charitable causes to educate children, while Yifan's death brings guilt and sorrow to a mourning Jieyu.

Cast
Zhang Ziyi as Du Fenyu (Tourvel)
Jang Dong-gun as Xie Yifan (Valmont)
Cecilia Cheung as Mo Jieyu (Merteuil)
Shawn Dou as Dai Wenzhou (Danceny)
Lisa Lu as Madam Du Ruixue (Rosemond)
Rong Rong as Mrs. Zhu (Madame de Volonges)
Candy Wang as Beibei, Mrs. Zhu's daughter (Cecile) 
Ye Xiangming as Wu Shaopu, the demonstrator
Xiao Shuli as Gui Zhen
Zhang Yun as Wen, Mrs. Zhu's maid
Wu Fang as Hong, Jieyu's maid
Chen Guodong as Gen
Zhang Han as Jin Zhihuan
Xue Wei as young lady
Hao Yifei as teacher
Zong Xiaojun as police captain
Yang Fan as policeman
Gang Xiaoxi as dance girl
Zhang Zichen as Cai Lu, Yifan's driver
Piao Yanni as make-up woman
Yan Hongyu as photographer
Jiang Yiyi as manicure maid
Dong Hailong as reporter
Son Seong-jae as saxophonist
Leng Haiming as art director
Yang Chen as MC
Xiang Dong as lawyer
Yin Yanbin as Japanese officer
Jean Favie "Ji En" as the French tailor
Li Shiping as young street beggar

References

External links

2012 films
2012 romantic drama films
2010s erotic thriller films
2010s Mandarin-language films
Chinese romantic drama films
Films based on French novels
Films based on works by Pierre Choderlos de Laclos
Films directed by Hur Jin-ho
Films set in 1931
Films set in Shanghai
Films with screenplays by Geling Yan
Works based on Les Liaisons dangereuses